Karunakaran Mukunth (born 6 February 1996) is an Indian cricketer. He made his first-class debut on 17 December 2019, for Tamil Nadu in the 2019–20 Ranji Trophy.

References

External links
 

1996 births
Living people
Indian cricketers
Tamil Nadu cricketers
Place of birth missing (living people)